Joseph Nollekens R.A. (11 August 1737 – 23 April 1823) was a sculptor from London generally considered to be the finest British sculptor of the late 18th century.

Life
Nollekens was born on 11 August 1737 at 28 Dean Street, Soho, London, the son of the Flemish painter Josef Frans Nollekens (1702–1748) who had moved from Antwerp to London in 1733. He studied first under another Flemish immigrant in London, the sculptor Peter Scheemakers, before studying and working as an antiques dealer, restorer and copier in Rome from 1760 or 1762. The sculptures he made in Rome included  a marble of Timocles Before Alexander, for which he was awarded fifty guineas by the Society of Arts, and busts of Laurence Sterne and David Garrick, who were visiting the city.

On his return to London in 1770 he set up as a maker of busts and monuments at 9, Mortimer Street, where he built up a large practice. Although he preferred working on mythological subjects, it was through his portrait busts that he became famous and one of the most fashionable portrait sculptors in Britain. In 1772 he married Mary, daughter of the judge and grocer Saunders Welch.

He enjoyed the patronage of king George III and went on to sculpt a number of British political figures, including George III himself, William Pitt the Younger, Charles James Fox, the Duke of Bedford and Charles Watson-Wentworth. He also made busts of  figures from the arts such as Benjamin West. Most of his subjects were represented in classical costume.

Faith, a sculpture commissioned by Henry Howard following the death of his wife Maria in 1788 in childbirth at Corby Castle, is said to be Nollekens' finest work. The sculpture can be seen in the Howard Chapel at the Parish Church of Wetheral, Cumbria.

Although he took great care over the modelling of the details of his sculptures, the marble versions were normally made by assistants, such as Sebastian Gahagan who carved Nollekens' statue of William Pitt for the Senate House at Cambridge, and L. Alexander Goblet. Some subjects were produced in large numbers: more than 70 replicas of Nollekens' bust of Pitt are known.

Nollekens  became an associate of the Royal Academy in 1771 and a full academician the following year.

Painted around that time, his portrait by the celebrated artist Mary Moser now hangs in the Yale Center for British Art.

Death
He died in London in 1823, having made a considerable fortune from his work; he left around £200,000 in his will. He is buried in Paddington Parish Church with a monument by William Behnes.

A biography Nollekens and his Times by his executor John Thomas Smith was published in 1828, portraying him as a grotesque miser. It has been described as "perhaps the most candid biography ever published in the English language." It has been suggested he was the model for the miser Briggs in Cecilia.

No. 44 Mortimer Street in Fitzrovia stands on the site of the house where Nollekens died and has a blue plaque commemorating him.

American poet Randall Jarrell commemorated Nollekens in his poem entitled "Nollekens", collected in his 1956 volume Selected Poems.

List of Works

 Bust of Samuel Johnson, Yale Center for British Art, New Haven, Connecticut
 Faith, St. Constantine's Church, Wetheral, Cumbria
 Castor and Pollux, Victoria and Albert Museum, Kensington, Greater London
 Memorial to William Windham, St. Margaret's Church, Felbrigg, Norfolk

References

Sources

Bibliography

External links

Joseph Nollekens (Getty Museum)
Three goddesses, Nollekens (Getty Museum)
Europe in the age of enlightenment and revolution, a catalog from The Metropolitan Museum of Art Libraries (fully available online as PDF), which contains material on Nollekens (see index)

1737 births
1823 deaths
18th-century English sculptors
18th-century English male artists
19th-century English sculptors
19th-century English male artists
English male sculptors
English people of Flemish descent
Royal Academicians
Sculptors from London